The 1972 United States House of Representatives elections in South Carolina were held on November 7, 1972 to select six Representatives for two-year terms from the state of South Carolina.  The primary elections were held on August 29 and the runoff elections were held two weeks later on September 12.  Five incumbents were re-elected and the only change was in the 6th district where Republican Edward Lunn Young succeeded Democrat John L. McMillan, who was defeated in the Democratic primary.  The composition of the state delegation after the elections was four Democrats and two Republicans.

1st congressional district
Incumbent Democratic Congressman Mendel Jackson Davis of the 1st congressional district, in office since 1971, won the Democratic primary and defeated Republican Sidi Limehouse in the general election.

Democratic primary

General election results

|-
| 
| colspan=5 |Democratic hold
|-

2nd congressional district
Incumbent Republican Congressman Floyd Spence of the 2nd congressional district, in office since 1971, was unopposed in his bid for re-election.

General election results

|-
| 
| colspan=5 |Republican hold
|-

3rd congressional district
Incumbent Democratic Congressman William Jennings Bryan Dorn of the 3rd congressional district, in office since 1951, defeated Republican challenger Ray Ethridge.

General election results

|-
| 
| colspan=5 |Democratic hold
|-

4th congressional district
Incumbent Democratic Congressman James R. Mann of the 4th congressional district, in office since 1969, defeated Republican challenger Wayne N. Whatley.

General election results

|-
| 
| colspan=5 |Democratic hold
|-

5th congressional district
Incumbent Democratic Congressman Thomas S. Gettys of the 5th congressional district, in office since 1964, defeated Republican challenger B. Leonard Phillips.

General election results

|-
| 
| colspan=5 |Democratic hold
|-

6th congressional district
Incumbent Democratic Congressman John L. McMillan of the 6th congressional district, in office since 1939, was defeated in the Democratic primary.  Republican Edward Lunn Young defeated Democrat John Jenrette in the general election.

Democratic primary

General election results

|-
| 
| colspan=5 |Republican gain from Democratic
|-

See also
United States House elections, 1972
United States Senate election in South Carolina, 1972
South Carolina's congressional districts

References

South Carolina
1972
1972 South Carolina elections